Stepan Ghazaryan  (Armenian: Ստեփան Ղազարյան; born 11 January 1985) is an Armenian footballer who plays goalkeeper for Banants. Ghazaryan has played for the Armenia U-17 in the UEFA European Under-17 Championship.

Career

International
Ghazaryan, represented Artsakh at the 2019 CONIFA European Football Cup.

References

External links
 Profile at FFA.am

 CIS Cup Squads 2008 at RSSSF.com

1985 births
Living people
Armenian footballers
Armenia international footballers
FC Urartu players
FC Ararat Yerevan players
Armenian Premier League players
FC Alashkert players
Association football goalkeepers